Johannes Fechner (born 25 November 1975) is a German lawyer and politician of the Social Democratic Party (SPD) who has been serving as a member of the Bundestag from the state of Baden-Württemberg since 2013.

Political career 
Fechner became a member of the Bundestag in the 2013 German federal election. He has since been a member of the Committee on Legal Affairs and Consumer Protection. Since 2014, he has been serving as his parliamentary group's spokesperson on legal affairs.

Fechner has also served on its Subcommittee on European Affairs (2014-2017), the Committee for the Scrutiny of Elections, Immunity and the Rules of Procedure (2014-2017) and the Committee for the Scrutiny of Acoustic Surveillance of the Private Home (since 2018). In 2018, he joined the parliamentary body in charge of appointing judges to the Highest Courts of Justice, namely the Federal Court of Justice (BGH), the Federal Administrative Court (BVerwG), the Federal Fiscal Court (BFH), the Federal Labour Court (BAG), and the Federal Social Court (BSG).

In the negotiations to form a fourth coalition government under the leadership of Chancellor Angela Merkel following the 2017 federal elections, Fechner was part of the working group on internal and legal affairs, led by Thomas de Maizière, Stephan Mayer and Heiko Maas.

In the negotiations to form a so-called traffic light coalition of the SPD, the Green Party and the Free Democrats (FDP) following the 2021 German elections, Fechner was part of his party's delegation in the working group on homeland security, civil rights and consumer protection, co-chaired by Christine Lambrecht, Konstantin von Notz and Wolfgang Kubicki.

Since the 2021 elections, Fechner has been serving as his parliamentary group’s spokesperson for the scrutiny of elections, immunity and the rules of procedure. Since 2022, he has been co-chairing – alongside Nina Warken – the Commission for the Reform of the Electoral Law and the Modernization of Parliamentary Work.

References

External links 

  
 Bundestag biography 

1975 births
Living people
Members of the Bundestag for Baden-Württemberg
Members of the Bundestag 2021–2025
Members of the Bundestag 2017–2021
Members of the Bundestag 2013–2017
Members of the Bundestag for the Social Democratic Party of Germany